Kamala is a first name and surname. It means lotus in Sanskrit. Notable people and characters with the name include:

People

First name
 Kamala Bahuguna (1923–2001), Indian politician
 Kamala Balakrishnan (1930–2018), Indian immunologist
 Kamala Bhattacharya (1945–1961), Indian martyr
 Kamala Bose (1947–2012), Indian classical vocalist
 Kamala Chakravarty (born 1928), Indian classical musician and dancer
 Kamala Chandrakirana, Indonesian women's rights activist
 Kamala Devi (actress) (born 1933), Indian actress
 Kamala Devi (footballer) (born 1992), Indian footballer
 Kamala-Jean Gopie, Jamaican-born Canadian political activist
 Kamala Hampana (born 1935), Indian writer
 Kamala Harris (born 1964), current vice president of the United States since 2021
 Kamala Hayman, New Zealand newspaper journalist
 Kamala Ibrahim Ishaq, Sudanese artist
 Kamala Kanta Kalita, Indian politician
 Kamala Kamesh (born 1952), Indian actress
 Kamala Kumari Karredula, Indian politician
 Kamala Krishnaswamy, Indian nutritionist
 Kamala Kotnis, Indian actress
 Kamala Shirin Lakhdhir, American diplomat, ambassador to Malaysia
 Kamala Laxman (died 2015), Indian author of children's books
 Kamala Lopez, American filmmaker
 Kamala Markandaya (1924–2004), Indian novelist and journalist
 Kamala Nehru (1899–1936), wife of Indian Prime Minister Jawahar Lal Nehru
 Kamala Nimbkar (1900–1979), American-born occupational therapist in India
 Kamala Parks, American drummer, songwriter
 Kamala Pujari, organic agriculture promoter from Orisha
 Kamala Ranathunga (born 1937), Sri Lankan politician
Kamala Rani Balakrishnan, Singaporean criminal
 Kamala Roka, Nepali politician
 Kamala Saikhom, Indian actress
 Kamala Sankaran, Indian academic administrator
 Kamala Sankrityayan (1920–2009), Indian writer
 Kamala Selvaraj, Indian obstetrician and gynecologist
 Kamala Shankar, Indian slide guitar player
 Kamala Sinha (1932–2014), Indian politician
 Kamala Sohonie (1912-1998), Indian biochemist
 Kamala Surayya (1934–2009), Indian short story writer and autobiographer
 Kamala Todd, Canadian filmmaker

Surname
 Diodorus Kamala (born 1968), Tanzanian politician
 Kumari Kamala (born 1934), Indian classical dancer

Stage name
 Kamala (wrestler) (James Arthur Harris, 1950–2020), American professional wrestler

Fictional characters
 Kamala Khan, Marvel Comics superheroine
 Kamala, a character in Siddhartha by Hermann Hesse
 Kamala, a character in "The Perfect Mate", an episode of Star Trek: The Next Generation
 Kamala, a main character in the Netflix coming of age comedy-drama series Never Have I Ever

See also
Kamela § People with the surname Kamela
 Komala § People with the name Komala
Kamla (name), given name and surname

Sanskrit-language names